The Centre Party was a centrist political party in Hungary.

History
The Centre Party came into being in 2001, with the cooperation of the Christian Democratic People's Party (KDNP), the Hungarian Democratic People's Party (MDNP), the Alliance of Green Democrats (ZDSZ) and Third Way for Hungary (HOM). The unusual alliance of centre-right and centre-left groups hindered the Centre Party's effectiveness and, eventually, two of the founding political formations quit the party. The Christian Democratic People's Party, after long internal disputes and legal battles, joined ranks with Viktor Orbán's Fidesz and the Hungarian Democratic People's Party re-merged with the Hungarian Democratic Forum (MDF). Mihály Kupa was the leader of the party until 2007. At the legislative elections, on 9 and 23 April 2006, the party won 0.32% of the popular vote and no seats.

The Centre party joined as a member to the Community for Social Justice People's Party (KTI) in 2013.

Electoral results

National Assembly

External links
Official site

2001 establishments in Hungary
2013 disestablishments in Hungary
Defunct political parties in Hungary
Political parties disestablished in 2013
Political parties established in 2001
Centrist parties in Hungary

it:Partito di Centro (Ungheria)